Streamstown is a hamlet in central Alberta, Canada within the County of Vermilion River.

Demographics 
The population of Streamstown according to the 2015 municipal census conducted by the County of Vermilion River is 20.

Attractions 
The hamlet contains a hall for community events, a baseball diamond and a small park which housed a miniature model of the hamlet as it stood in 1945. The miniature model constructed by resident, Greg Davies (1939-2015) stood in the town from 2010 to 2016.

The Streamstown Cemetery, located just outside the hamlet, houses the grave of George Frederick Ives (1881–1993), the last surviving veteran of the Second Boer War.

See also 
List of communities in Alberta
List of hamlets in Alberta

References 

Hamlets in Alberta
County of Vermilion River